Associazione Sportiva Dilettantistica Vastese Calcio 1902 (formerly F.C. Pro Vasto) is an Italian association football club based in Vasto, Abruzzo. The club was founded in 1922 and subsequently refounded in 1981 and 1995. As of summer 2010 the club is dissolved, and reformed in 2012 as Vastese Calcio 1902. It plays in Serie D.

History
Originally known as Vastese, the club was founded on July 4, 1922, and since then spent several seasons in the Italian lower professional tiers of Serie C1 and Serie C2. The club renamed to Pro Vasto in 1952, but was cancelled in 1981 due to financial problems. A minor local team in Promozione league called Società Sportiva Incoronata took its place, and switched denomination to Associazione Calcio Vasto 82 one year later, being promoted to Serie D in 1984 only to be relegated back in 1987. After this relegation, the club changed denomination again, this time to Vastese Calcio, being promoted back to Serie D in 1988, and returning to Serie C2 in 1990 after a successful season in the Italian top amateur level.

Relegated from Serie C2 in 1994, the club was successively readmitted back into professionalism to fill a league vacancy but the club declared bankruptcy only one year later. In 1997 local Promozione club Vasto Marina changed its denomination to the current one of Football Club Pro Vasto and made two consecutive promotions to return to Serie D in 1999. However, the club was relegated to Eccellenza league in 2000. A new property then acquired the club bringing it back into the Italian fifth tier, one year later and returning into Serie C2 in 2004. F.C. Pro Vasto was then relegated to Serie D in 2007 and played in this league until 2009, when the club won the tournament after a 2–1 win against Tolentino in the last match of the season after winning the last ten matches in a row. The club then took part in the Lega Pro Seconda Divisione in the 2009–10 season.

After bankruptcy in 2010, the club was forced out of business. In 2012 San Paolo Calcio Vasto assumed the name Vastese Calcio 1902 and joined Promozione. It was promoted to Eccellenza Abruzzo in 2013 at the first attempt.

Colours and badge
The club's official colours are red and white.

References

Football clubs in Abruzzo
Association football clubs established in 1902
1902 establishments in Italy
Serie C clubs